Buol may refer to:

 Buol Island, Indonesia
 Buol (city), Indonesia
 Buol (village), Indonesia
 Buol Regency, Indonesia
 Buol language, a language in the Gorontalo-Mongondow languages group
 Persbul Buol, an Indonesian football (soccer) club

People with the surname
 Rudolf von Buol-Berenberg (1842-1902), German judge and politician, president of German Reichstag
 Karl Rudolf Graf von Buol-Schauenstein (1760–1833), Bishop of Chur, Switzerland
 Count Karl Ferdinand von Buol (1797–1865), Austrian diplomat and politician
 Peter Buol (1873–1939), the first mayor of Las Vegas, Nevada (1911–1913)

See also 
 Buol, Indonesia (disambiguation)
 Bwool (disambiguation)
 Boeol (disambiguation)
 Bul (disambiguation)
 Buol-Berenberg